In the canonical gospels, Pilate's court refers to the trial of Jesus in praetorium before Pontius Pilate, preceded by the Sanhedrin Trial. In the Gospel of Luke, Pilate finds that Jesus, being from Galilee, belonged to Herod Antipas' jurisdiction, and so he decides to send Jesus to Herod. After questioning Jesus and receiving very few replies, Herod sees Jesus as no threat and returns him to Pilate. 

It was noted that Pilate appears as an advocate pleading Jesus' case rather than as a judge in an official hearing. In the Gospel of John (18:28–19:13),  his “to-ing and fro-ing,” that is, Pilate's back and forth movement from inside the praetorium to the outside courtyard, indicates his “wavering position.”

Background
As prefect of Roman Judea, Pilate was subordinate to the Roman legate in Syria. Pilate resided on the coast at Caesarea Maritima. On those occasions when he had to be in Jerusalem, he used the palace compound built by Herod the Great as his praetorium or headquarters. The palace was located in the western part of the upper city and served as both a comfortable residence and fortress.

Early pilgrims to Jerusalem generally identified the praetorium with the Antonia Fortress, where the traditional Way of the Cross begins. However, the archaeological evidence, which dates the fortress remnants to the 2nd century CE, as well as the tense situation requiring Pilate to be near the Second Temple as the center of Passover activity, support the Herod's Palace location.

The Gospel of Mark uses the word aulē ("hall", "palace") to identify the praetorium. Fearing defilement, the Sanhedrin elders did not enter the court, and Pilate's discussion with them occurred outside the praetorium. Outside the praetorium proper, there was an area called the Pavement. Pilate's judgement seat, in which he conversed with the elders, was located there.

Gospel narratives

Overview 

The entire trial of Jesus is told in the verses Matthew 26:57–27:31, Mark 14:53–15:20, Luke 22:54–23:26, and John 18:13–19:16. The trial can be subdivided into four episodes:
the Sanhedrin trial of Jesus (before Caiaphas or Annas);
the trial of Jesus at Pilate's court (according to Luke also briefly at the court of Herod Antipas);
Pilate's consideration of the crowd's opinion to give Barabbas amnesty and condemn Jesus to death; and
the abduction of Jesus by Roman soldiers (according to John the chief priests) and the mistreatment and/or mocking of Jesus (according to Luke and John, this happened before Jesus was condemned by Pilate, according to Mark and Matthew not until after his condemnation).
In all four gospels, the Denial of Peter functions as an intermission during the Sanhedrin trial, while Matthew adds an intermission during the trial before Pilate that narrates the suicide of Judas Iscariot.

As the religions professed by the Israelites (Second Temple Judaism) and the Romans (Religion in ancient Rome) were different, and since at the time Jerusalem was part of Roman Judea, the charges of the Sanhedrin against Jesus held no power before Pilate. From the three charges brought by the Pharisees leaders (perverting the nation, forbidding the payment of tribute, and sedition against the Roman Empire), Pilate picks up on the third one, asking: "Are you the King of the Jews?". Jesus replies with "You have said so". Then the hearing continues, and Pilate finally asks Jesus "What is truth?". This was said after learning that Jesus did not wish to claim any terrestrial kingdom. He was therefore not a political threat and could be seen as innocent of such a charge. 

Stepping back outside, Pilate publicly declared that he found no basis to charge Jesus, asking them if they wanted Jesus freed, which they declined, preferring the freedom of Barabbas. This meant capital punishment for Jesus. The universal rule of the Roman Empire limited capital punishment strictly to the tribunal of the Roman governor and Pilate decided to publicly wash his hands as not being party to Jesus' death. Nevertheless, since only the Roman authority could order crucifixion and since the penalty was carried out by Roman soldiers, Pilate was responsible for Jesus' death, a judgment Reynolds Price describes as an exercise in skillful backwater diplomacy.

Commentary
Philo, who had a negative view of Pilate, mentions him ordering executions without trials.

Narrative comparison

Chronological comparison

See also
 Blood curse
 Chronology of Jesus
 Ecce homo
 Life of Jesus in the New Testament

Notes

Jesus and history
Crucifixion of Jesus
Passion of Jesus
Pontius Pilate